The 1977 Copa Fraternidad was the 7th edition of the Central American club championship.  Guatemalan side C.S.D. Municipal conquered its 2nd title.

Teams

Standings

Results

References

1977
1977
1977–78 in Guatemalan football
1977–78 in Costa Rican football
1977–78 in Salvadoran football